The England national football team has represented England in international football since the first international match in 1872. It is controlled by The Football Association (FA), the governing body for football in England, which is affiliated with UEFA and comes under the global jurisdiction of world football's governing body FIFA. England competes in the three major international tournament contested by European nations: the FIFA World Cup, the UEFA European Championship, and the UEFA Nations League.

England is the joint oldest national team in football having played in the world's first international football match in 1872, against Scotland. England's home ground is Wembley Stadium, London, and its training headquarters is St George's Park, Burton upon Trent. The team's manager is Gareth Southgate.

England won the 1966 World Cup final (a tournament it also hosted), making it one of eight nations to have won the World Cup. They have qualified for the World Cup 16 times, with their best other performances being fourth place in both 1990 and 2018. England has never won the European Championship, with their best performance to date being runners-up in 2020. As a constituent country of the United Kingdom, England is not a member of the International Olympic Committee and so does not compete at the Olympic Games. England is currently the only team to have won the World Cup at senior level, but not their major continental title, and the only non-sovereign entity to have won the World Cup.

History

Early years

The England national football team is the joint-oldest in the world; it was formed at the same time as Scotland. A representative match between England and Scotland was played on 5 March 1870, having been organised by the Football Association. A return fixture was organised by representatives of Scottish football teams on 30 November 1872. This match, played at Hamilton Crescent in Scotland, is viewed as the first official international football match, because the two teams were independently selected and operated, rather than being the work of a single football association. Over the next 40 years, England played exclusively with the other three Home Nations—Scotland, Wales and Ireland—in the British Home Championship.

At first, England had no permanent home stadium. They joined FIFA in 1906 and played their first games against countries other than the Home Nations on a tour of Central Europe in 1908. Wembley Stadium was opened in 1923 and became their home ground. The relationship between England and FIFA became strained, and this resulted in their departure from FIFA in 1928, before they rejoined in 1946. As a result, they did not compete in a World Cup until 1950, in which they were beaten in a 1–0 defeat by the United States, failing to get past the first round in one of the most embarrassing defeats in the team's history.

Their first defeat on home soil to a foreign team was a 2–0 loss to Ireland, on 21 September 1949 at Goodison Park. A 6–3 loss in 1953 to Hungary, was their second defeat by a foreign team at Wembley. In the return match in Budapest, Hungary won 7–1. This stands as England's largest ever defeat. After the game, a bewildered Syd Owen said, "it was like playing men from outer space". In the 1954 FIFA World Cup, England reached the quarter-finals for the first time, and lost 4–2 to reigning champions Uruguay.

Walter Winterbottom and Alf Ramsey

Although Walter Winterbottom was appointed as England's first full-time manager in 1946, the team was still picked by a committee until Alf Ramsey took over in 1963. The 1966 FIFA World Cup was hosted in England and Ramsey guided England to victory with a 4–2 win against West Germany after extra time in the final, during which Geoff Hurst scored a hat-trick. In UEFA Euro 1968, the team reached the semi-finals for the first time, being eliminated by Yugoslavia.

England qualified automatically for the 1970 FIFA World Cup in Mexico as reigning champions, and reached the quarter-finals, where they were knocked out by West Germany. England had been 2–0 up, but were eventually beaten 3–2 after extra time. They then failed to qualify for the 1974 FIFA World Cup, leading to Ramsey's dismissal by the FA.

Don Revie, Ron Greenwood and Bobby Robson
Following Ramsey's dismissal, Joe Mercer took immediate temporary charge of England for a seven-match spell until Don Revie was appointed as new permanent manager in 1974. Under Revie, the team underperformed and failed to qualify for either UEFA Euro 1976 or the 1978 FIFA World Cup. Revie resigned in 1977 and was replaced by Ron Greenwood, under whom performances improved. The team qualified for UEFA Euro 1980 without losing any of their games, but exited in the group stage of the final tournament. They also qualified for the 1982 FIFA World Cup in Spain; however, despite not losing a game, they were eliminated at the second group stage.

Bobby Robson managed England from 1982 to 1990. Although the team failed to qualify for UEFA Euro 1984, they reached the quarter-finals of the 1986 FIFA World Cup, losing 2–1 to Argentina in a game made famous by two highly contrasting goals scored by Maradona – the first being blatantly knocked in by his hand, prompting his "Hand of God" remark, the second being an outstandingly skilful individual goal, involving high speed dribbling past several opponents. England striker Gary Lineker finished as the tournament's top scorer with six goals.

England went on to lose every match at UEFA Euro 1988. They next achieved their second best result in the 1990 FIFA World Cup by finishing fourth – losing again to West Germany after a closely contested semi-final finishing 1–1 after extra time, then 3–4 in England's first penalty shoot-out. Despite losing to Italy in the third place play-off, the members of the England team were given bronze medals identical to the Italians'. Due to the team's good performance at the tournament against general expectations, and the emotional nature of the narrow defeat to West Germany, the team were welcomed home as heroes and thousands of people lined the streets for an open-top bus parade.

Graham Taylor, Terry Venables, Glenn Hoddle and Kevin Keegan
The 1990s saw four England managers follow Robson, each in the role for a relatively brief period. Graham Taylor was Robson's immediate successor. England failed to win any matches at UEFA Euro 1992, drawing with tournament winners Denmark and later with France, before being eliminated by host nation Sweden. The team then failed to qualify for the 1994 FIFA World Cup after losing a controversial game against the Netherlands in Rotterdam, which resulted in Taylor's resignation. Taylor faced much newspaper criticism during his tenure for his tactics and team selections.

Between 1994 and 1996, Terry Venables took charge of the team. At UEFA Euro 1996, held in England, they equalled their best performance at a European Championship, reaching the semi-finals as they did in 1968, before exiting via another penalty shoot-out loss to Germany. England striker Alan Shearer was the tournament's top scorer with five goals. At Euro 96, the song "Three Lions" by Baddiel, Skinner and The Lightning Seeds became the definitive anthem for fans on the terraces. Venables announced before the tournament that he would resign at the end of it, following investigations into his personal financial activities and ahead of upcoming court cases. Due to the controversy around him, the FA stressed that he was the coach, not the manager, of the team.

Venables' successor, Glenn Hoddle, took the team to the 1998 FIFA World Cup  in which England were eliminated in the second round, again by Argentina and again on penalties (after a 2–2 draw). In February 1999, Hoddle was sacked by the FA due to controversial comments he had made about disabled people to a newspaper. Howard Wilkinson took over as caretaker manager for two matches. Kevin Keegan was then appointed as the new permanent manager and took England to UEFA Euro 2000, but the team exited in the group stage and he unexpectedly resigned shortly afterwards.

Sven-Göran Eriksson, Steve McClaren and Fabio Capello

Peter Taylor was appointed as caretaker manager for one match, before Sven-Göran Eriksson took charge between 2001 and 2006, and was the team's first non-English manager. He guided England to the quarter-finals of the 2002 FIFA World Cup, UEFA Euro 2004 and the 2006 FIFA World Cup. England lost only five competitive matches during his entire tenure, and rose to number four in the world ranking under his guidance. Eriksson's contract was extended by the FA by two years, to include UEFA Euro 2008, but was terminated by them after the 2006 World Cup.

Steve McClaren was then appointed as manager, but after failing to qualify for Euro 2008 he was sacked on 22 November 2007 after 18 matches in charge. The following month, he was replaced by a second foreign manager, Italian Fabio Capello, whose previous experience included successful spells at Juventus and Real Madrid. England won all but one of their qualifying games for the 2010 FIFA World Cup, but at the tournament itself, England drew their opening two games; this led to questions about the team's spirit, tactics and ability to handle pressure. They progressed to the next round, however, where they were beaten 4–1 by Germany, their heaviest defeat in a World Cup finals tournament match. In February 2012, Capello resigned from his role as England manager, following a disagreement with the FA over their request to remove John Terry from team captaincy after accusations of racial abuse concerning the player.

Roy Hodgson, Sam Allardyce and Gareth Southgate
Following Capello's departure, Stuart Pearce was appointed as caretaker manager for one match, after which in May 2012, Roy Hodgson was announced as the new manager, just six weeks before UEFA Euro 2012. England managed to finish top of their group, but exited the Championships in the quarter-finals via a penalty shoot-out against Italy. In the 2014 FIFA World Cup, England were eliminated at the group stage for the first time since the 1958 World Cup, and the first time at a major tournament since Euro 2000. England qualified unbeaten for UEFA Euro 2016, but were ultimately eliminated in the Round of 16, losing 2–1 to Iceland. Hodgson resigned as manager in June 2016, and just under a month later was replaced by Sam Allardyce. However, after only 67 days in charge, Allardyce resigned from his managerial post by mutual agreement, after an alleged breach of FA rules, making him the shortest serving permanent England manager. Allardyce's sole match as England manager was a 1–0 victory over Slovakia, which made him the only permanent England manager ever to leave with a 100% win rate.

Gareth Southgate, then the coach of the England under-21 team, was put in temporary charge of the national team until November 2016, before being given the position on a permanent basis. Under Southgate, England qualified comfortably for the 2018 FIFA World Cup and came second in their group at the tournament. They defeated Colombia on penalties in the first knock-out round, and then beat Sweden 2–0 in the quarter-final to reach only their third World Cup semi-final. In the semi-final, they were beaten 2–1 in extra time by Croatia and then were beaten by Belgium for a second time, 2–0, in the third place match. England striker Harry Kane finished the tournament as top scorer with six goals.

On 14 November 2019, England played their 1000th International match, defeating Montenegro 7–0 at Wembley in a UEFA Euro 2020 qualifying match.

At the delayed UEFA Euro 2020, England reached the  final of a major tournament for the first time since 1966 and their first ever European Championship final appearance. After finishing top of a group including Croatia, Scotland and Czech Republic, the Three Lions would subsequently defeat Germany, Ukraine and Denmark to advance to the final. In the final held at Wembley, England were defeated by Italy on penalties after a 1–1 draw.

At the 2022 FIFA World Cup, England defeated Iran and Wales in the group stage to qualify for the round of 16. In the round of 16, England defeated the reigning African champions Senegal by 3–0, however, England were eliminated by the reigning world champions France in the quarter-finals, 2–1. Harry Kane's goal against France was his 53rd for England, equalling the all-time record. However, he would later miss an 84th-minute penalty with the chance to level the match.

Team image

Kits and crest

Kit suppliers

Kit deals

Crest
The motif of the England national football team has three lions passant guardant, the emblem of King Richard I, who reigned from 1189 to 1199. In 1872, English players wore white jerseys emblazoned with the three lions crest of the Football Association. The lions, often blue, have had minor changes to colour and appearance. Initially topped by a crown, this was removed in 1949 when the FA was given an official coat of arms by the College of Arms; this introduced ten Tudor roses, one for each of the regional branches of the FA. Since 2003, England top their logo with a star to recognise their World Cup win in 1966; this was first embroidered onto the left sleeve of the home kit, and a year later was moved to its current position, first on the away shirt.

Colours

England's traditional home colours are white shirts, navy blue shorts and white or black socks. The team has periodically worn an all-white kit.

Although England's first away kits were blue, England's traditional away colours are red shirts, white shorts and red socks. In 1996, England's away kit was changed to grey shirts, shorts and socks. This kit was only worn three times, including against Germany in the semi-final of Euro 1996 but the deviation from the traditional red was unpopular with supporters and the England away kit remained red until 2011, when a navy blue away kit was introduced. The away kit is also sometimes worn during home matches, when a new edition has been released to promote it.

England have occasionally had a third kit. At the 1970 World Cup England wore a third kit with pale blue shirts, shorts and socks against Czechoslovakia. They had a kit similar to Brazil's, with yellow shirts, yellow socks and blue shorts which they wore in the summer of 1973. For the World Cup in 1986 England had a third kit of pale blue, imitating that worn in Mexico 16 years before and England retained pale blue third kits until 1992, but they were rarely used.

Umbro first agreed to manufacture the kit in 1954 and since then has supplied most of the kits, the exceptions being from 1959 to 1965 with Bukta and 1974–1984 with Admiral. Nike purchased Umbro in 2008 and took over as kit supplier in 2013 following their sale of the Umbro brand.

Home stadium

For the first 50 years of their existence, England played their home matches all around the country. They initially used cricket grounds before later moving on to football club stadiums. The original Empire Stadium was built in Wembley, London, for the British Empire Exhibition.

England played their first match at the stadium in 1924 against Scotland and for the next 27 years Wembley was used as a venue for matches against Scotland only. The stadium later became known simply as Wembley Stadium and it became England's permanent home stadium during the 1950s. In October 2000, the stadium closed its doors, ending with a defeat against Germany.

This stadium was demolished during the period of 2002–03, and work began to completely rebuild it. During this time, England played at venues across the country, though by the time of the 2006 World Cup qualification, this had largely settled down to having Manchester United's Old Trafford stadium as the primary venue, with Newcastle United's St. James' Park used on occasions when Old Trafford was unavailable.

Their first match in the new Wembley Stadium was in March 2007 when they drew with Brazil. The stadium is now owned by the Football Association, via its subsidiary Wembley National Stadium Limited.

Rivalries
England has three main rivalries with other footballing nations.

Scotland

England's rivalry with Scotland is one of the fiercest international rivalries that exists. It is the oldest international fixture in the world, first played in 1872 at Hamilton Crescent, Glasgow. The history of the British Isles has led to much rivalry between the nations in many forms, and the social and cultural effects of centuries of antagonism and conflict between the two has contributed to the intense nature of the sporting contests. Scottish nationalism has also been a factor in the Scots' desire to defeat England above all other rivals, with Scottish sports journalists traditionally referring to the English as the "Auld Enemy". The footballing rivalry has diminished somewhat since the late 1970s, particularly since the annual fixture stopped in 1989. For England, games against Germany and Argentina are now considered to be more important than the historic rivalry with Scotland.

Germany

England's rivalry with Germany is considered to be mainly an English phenomenon—in the run-up to any competition match between the two teams, many UK newspapers will print articles detailing results of previous encounters, such as those in 1966 and 1990. However, this rivalry has diminished significantly in recent years. Most German fans consider the Netherlands or Italy to be their traditional footballing rivals, and as such, usually the rivalry is not taken quite as seriously there as it is in England.

Argentina

England's rivalry with Argentina is highly competitive. Games between the two teams, even those that are only friendly matches, are often marked by notable and sometimes controversial incidents such as the hand of God in 1986. The rivalry is unusual in that it is an intercontinental one; typically such footballing rivalries exist between countries that are close to one another, for example France–Italy or Argentina–Brazil. England is regarded in Argentina as one of the major rivals of the national football team, matched only by Brazil and Uruguay. The rivalry is, to a lesser extent reciprocal in England, locally described as a grudge match although matches against Germany carry a greater significance in popular perception. The rivalry emerged across several games during the latter half of the 20th century, even though as of 2008 the teams have played each other on only 14 occasions in full internationals. The rivalry was intensified, particularly in Argentina, by non-footballing events, especially the 1982 Falklands War between Argentina and the United Kingdom. However, England and Argentina haven't met since a friendly in November 2005.

Media coverage
All England matches are broadcast with full commentary on talkSPORT and BBC Radio 5 Live. From the 2008–09 season until the 2017–18 season, England's home and away qualifiers, and friendlies both home and away were broadcast live on ITV Sport (often with the exception of STV, the ITV franchisee in central and northern Scotland). England's away qualifiers for the 2010 World Cup were shown on Setanta Sports until that company's collapse. As a result of Setanta Sports's demise, England's World Cup qualifier in Ukraine on 10 October 2009 was shown in the United Kingdom on a pay-per-view basis via the internet only. This one-off event was the first time an England game had been screened in such a way. The number of subscribers, paying between £4.99 and £11.99 each, was estimated at between 250,000 and 300,000 and the total number of viewers at around 500,000. In 2018, Sky Sports broadcast the England Nations League and in-season friendlies, until 2021 and ITV Sport broadcast the European Qualifiers for Euro-World Cups and pre-tournament friendlies (after the Nations League group matches end), until 2022. In April 2022, Channel 4 won the rights for England matches until June 2024, including 2022–23 UEFA Nations League matches, UEFA Euro 2024 qualifying games, and friendlies. 2022 FIFA World Cup rights remain with the BBC and ITV.

Results and fixtures

The following is a list of match results in the last 12 months, as well as any future matches that have been scheduled.

2022

2023

Coaching staff

Players

Current squad

Caps and goals are correct as of 10 December 2022, after the match against France.

Recent call-ups
The following players have also been called up to the England squad within the last twelve months.

INJ Withdrew due to injury
PRE Preliminary squad / standby
RET Retired from the national team
SUS Serving suspension
WD Player withdrew from the squad due to non-injury issue.

Individual records

Player records

Most caps
.

Most goals

.

Most clean sheets

.

Manager records

 Most manager appearances
 Walter Winterbottom: 139
 Highest win ratio (minimum 25 games in charge) 
 Fabio Capello: 66.7%
 Youngest to take job
 Walter Winterbottom: 33 years old
 Oldest to take job
 Roy Hodgson: 64 years old

Team records

 Biggest win
 13–0 vs. Ireland, 18 February 1882
 Biggest defeat 
 1–7 vs. Hungary, 23 May 1954
 Longest unbeaten run
 22 games from 18 November 2020 to 29 March 2022   
 Longest winless run
 7 games from 11 May 1958 to 4 October 1958
 Most consecutive wins
 10 games from 6 June 1908 to 1 June 1909
 Matches without conceding a goal
 7 games from 2 June 2021 to 3 July 2021

Competitive record
For the all-time record of the national team against opposing nations, see the team's all-time record page

FIFA World Cup

England first appeared at the 1950 FIFA World Cup, and have subsequently qualified for a total of 16 FIFA World Cup finals tournaments, tied for sixth best by number of appearances. They are also placed sixth by number of wins, with 32. The national team is one of only eight nations to have won at least one FIFA World Cup title. The England team won their first and only World Cup title in 1966. The tournament was played on home soil, and England defeated West Germany 4–2 in the final. In 1990, England finished in fourth place, losing 2–1 to host nation Italy in the third place play-off, following defeat on penalties, after extra time, to champions West Germany in the semi-final. They also finished in fourth place in 2018, losing 2–0 to Belgium in the third place play-off, following a 2–1 defeat to Croatia, again after extra time, in the semi-final. The team also reached the quarter-final stage in 1954, 1962, 1970, 1986, 2002, 2006 and 2022.

England failed to qualify for the World Cup in 1974, 1978 and 1994. The team's earliest exit in the finals tournament was its elimination in the first round in 1950, 1958 and, most recently, the 2014 FIFA World Cup. This was after being defeated in both their opening two matches for the first time, against Italy and Uruguay in Group D. In 1950, four teams remained after the first round, in 1958 eight teams remained and in 2014 sixteen teams remained. In 2010, England suffered its most resounding World Cup defeat, 4–1 to Germany, in the round of 16 stage.

UEFA European Championship

England first entered the UEFA European Championship in 1964, and have since qualified for ten finals tournaments, tied for fourth best by number of finals appearances. England's greatest achievements at the UEFA European Championship have been to finish runners-up the in '2020' championship in 2021, and in third place in 1968. The team also reached the semi-finals in 1996, a tournament they hosted. Additionally, the team has also reached the quarter-final on two further occasions, in 2004 and 2012.

The team's worst results in the finals tournament, to date, have been first-round eliminations in 1980, 1988, 1992 and 2000, whilst they failed to qualify for the finals in 1964, 1972, 1976, 1984 and 2008.

UEFA Nations League

Minor tournaments

FIFA Rankings

Last update was on 22 December 2022.  
Source:

Honours

Major
 FIFA World Cup
  Champions: 1966
 UEFA European Championship
  Runners-up: 2020
  Third place: 1968, 1996 
 UEFA Nations League
  Third place: 2019

Regional
 British Home Championship
  Champions (54): (including 20 shared)
 Rous Cup
  Champions: 1986, 1988, 1989

Other
 FIFA World Cup Fair Play Trophy
  Champions: 1990, 1998, 2022

Exhibition tournament
 England Challenge Cup: 1991
 Tournoi de France: 1997
 FA Summer Tournament: 2004

Summary

See also

 Great Britain men's Olympic football team
 England national football team manager
 England women's national football team
 England national amateur football team
 United Kingdom national football team
 England national football C team

References

Notes

Citations

External links

 
 England at FIFA
 England at UEFA
 A complete database of England International since 1872 by England Stats

England national football team
European national association football teams
FIFA World Cup-winning countries
Football teams in England
1872 establishments in England